Runet Prize is a national award of the Russian Federation. Its founder is the Federal Agency for Press and Mass Media, the Russian governmental agency in charge of overseeing the country's mass media.

First awarded in 2004, the prize honors top Russian language (mainly Russia-based) websites in the categories:
State and Society
Science and Education
Culture and Mass Communications
Economics and Business
Health and Recreation
Mobile app
Internet project
Internet community of the year
Game of the year.

Runet is a portmanteau of the words Russia and Internet.

See also
List of computer-related awards

References

External links
Runet Prize website 

Internet in Russia
Computer-related awards
Web awards
Internet pioneers